Lucian Burdujan (born 18 February 1984 in Piatra Neamț) is a Romanian footballer who plays for Gamma Ethniki club AEP Karagiannia F.C. as a striker or a winger.

Club career
He started his career at Ceahlǎul in 2002. In 2004, he transferred to FC Rapid București but failed to play regularly in the first eleven. His best spell at Rapid was during the first season, when he managed to score eight goals. He was injured for most of the 2006–07 season.

In the summer of 2008, Burdujan left Rapid for SC Vaslui in exchange for Ştefan Mardare. He scored his first goal for Vaslui against Neftchi Baku in the UEFA Intertoto Cup. At the end of the 2008–09 season, he was Vaslui's top scorer in all competitions, with eleven goals, tied with Mike Temwanjera.

On 5 April 2011, now playing for Steaua București, Burdujan scored the first and fifth goals in Steaua's 5–0 home victory over Unirea Urziceni.

Burdujan left Steaua, signing a two-and-a-half-year contract with Ukrainian team Chornomorets on 24 June 2011.

On 18 September 2014 it was announced Burdujan had joined Hoverla Uzhhorod from Tavriya Simferopol.

Club statistics
Statistics accurate as of match played 1 July 2013

Honours

Club
Rapid București
Romanian Cup
Winner: 2006, 2007
Liga I
Runner-up: 2006
Supercupa României
Runner-up: 2006, 2007

Vaslui
 Cupa României
 Runner-up: 2010
UEFA Intertoto Cup
Winner: 2008

Hatta
 UAE Division One
Winner: 2015–16

Europa FC
 Gibraltar Premier Division
 Runner-up: 2016

References

External links
 

1984 births
Living people
Sportspeople from Piatra Neamț
Romanian footballers
Association football wingers
Romanian expatriate footballers
Romania under-21 international footballers
FC Vaslui players
FC Rapid București players
CSM Ceahlăul Piatra Neamț players
FC Steaua București players
FC Chornomorets Odesa players
SC Tavriya Simferopol players
FC Hoverla Uzhhorod players
Hatta Club players
AEL Kalloni F.C. players
Europa F.C. players
Liga I players
UAE First Division League players
Ukrainian Premier League players
Football League (Greece) players
Expatriate footballers in Ukraine
Romanian expatriate sportspeople in Ukraine
Expatriate footballers in the United Arab Emirates
Expatriate footballers in Gibraltar
Expatriate footballers in Greece
UAE Pro League players
Romanian expatriate sportspeople in the United Arab Emirates
Romanian expatriate sportspeople in Greece
Romanian expatriate sportspeople in Gibraltar